Rebel Music is the debut album by British rapper and producer Rebel MC, released in 1990 on Desire Records.

Singles
The album contains four singles which charted in several countries: "Just Keep Rockin'" (with Double Trouble; UK No. 11, Belgium No. 14, Netherlands No. 3), "Street Tuff" (also with Double Trouble; UK No. 3, Australia No. 85, Belgium No. 7, Netherlands No. 3, New Zealand No. 29, Sweden No. 12), "Better World" (UK No. 20, Belgium No. 22, Netherlands No. 14, New Zealand No. 4) and the title track "Rebel Music" (UK No. 53, Netherlands No. 84, New Zealand No. 15).

Track listing

Charts

References

External links
Rebel Music at Discogs

1990 debut albums
Albums produced by Simon Law